Ginglymostoma unami, also known as the Pacific nurse shark is a nurse sharks of the family Ginglymostomatidae. It is found in southeastern coast of Baja California, Mexico to Costa Rica including Gulf of California. It is 2.8 meters long. This species differs from Ginglymostoma cirratum between posterior end of the second dorsal fin and the beginning of the caudal lobe, both being shorter; the new species also differs by the position of the insertion of the first dorsal fin with regard to the pelvic fins and in the form and number of keels on the dermal denticles and teeth morphology.

References

Pacific nurse shark
Western Central American coastal fauna
Pacific nurse shark